Pycnoclavella diminuta, known as the white-spotted sea squirt, white-spot ascidian,
and white-spotted ascidian, is a species of tunicate (sea squirt), in the genus Pycnoclavella. Like all ascidians, these sessile animals are filter feeders.

Description
Pycnoclavela diminuta lives in colonies composed of small clusters of zooids that originate from a common stalk. They are golden yellow-orange in colour and have white spots. The spots vary in shape and size, but are well defined, and are consistent throughout the colony.

This species can be confused with Pycnoclavella flava (formerly Clavina flava), which may also have white spots. But Pycnoclavela diminuta can be differentiated in that the spots are always clearly defined and always constant.

Distribution
This species occurs in numerous locations, including:
Western Pacific Ocean
Indo-West Pacific
Australia
Lord Howe Island
New Caledonia
Indonesia
Philippines

Behaviour
Pycnoclavella diminuta is a sessile suspension feeder.

Habitat
This ascidian lives in depths from 5 to 20 metres in the benthic zone in caves and under ledges. It often occurs in environments with soft corals such as Dendronephthya and Scleronephthya.

References

Further reading
Coleman, N., 2000. Marine life of the Maldives. Atoll Editions, Victoria, Australia.

Kott, P., 1990. The Australian Ascidiacea. Part 2: Aplousobranchia (1). Memoirs of the Queensland Museum 29 (1): 1-226.
Kott, P., 1992. The Australian Ascidiacea. Part 3: Aplousobranchia (2). Memoirs of the Queensland Museum 32 (2): 375-620.
Kott, P., 2001. The Australian Ascidiacea. Part 4: Aplousobranchia (3), Didemnidae. Memoirs of the Queensland Museum 47(1): 1-407.
Kott, P., 2002. Ascidiacea (Tunicata) from Darwin, Northern Territory, Australia. The Beagle 18: 19-55.

Millar, R.H., 1970. British Ascidians. Tunicata: Ascidiacea. Keys and Notes for the Identification of the Species. Synopses of The British Fauna (New Series) 1.
Monniot, F., C. Monniot & P. Laboute, 1991. Coral Reef Ascidians of New Caledonia. Collection Fauna tropicale 30, ORSTOM, Paris.
Monniot, F. & C. Monniot, 1996. New collections of ascidians from the western Pacific and Southeastern Asia. Micronesia 29 (2): 133-279.
Monniot, F. & C. Monniot, 2001. Ascidians from the tropical western Pacific. Zoosystema 23 (2): 201-383.
Nishikawa, T., 1980. Contributions to the Japanese ascidian fauna. XXXIII: Ascidians from the coast of Kii Peninsula, Middle Japan, with descriptions of two new species. Memoirs of the National Science Museum, Tokyo 13: 97-111.

Enterogona
Animals described in 1957